The 36th Gosei began on 12 May 2010 – 29 August 2010. Hane Naoki won the challenger tournament and faced title holder Sakai Hideyuki in a best-of-five final to decide the winner. Sakai Hideyuki won the first two games, but Hane Naoki fought back and won the last three games, thus became the new title holder. The winner's prize was ¥8,000,000.

Tournament

Finals

References

2011 in go
Go competitions in Japan